Rhabdopleura compacta is a sessile hemichordate. It is a suspension feeder that secretes tubes on the ocean floor.

Unlike all other Rhabdopleura species, the zooids have black elongated arms with no tentacles.

Distribution
Rhabdopleura compacta occurs in Atlantic waters. It has been found in the English Channel and the Gulf of Mexico.

Reproduction and life cycle
The reproduction and life cycle of Rhabdopleura compacta has been studied by Stebbing (1970) and Dilly (1973).

Gonads are shown in the image below.

References

compacta
Animals described in 1880
Fauna of the Atlantic Ocean